Type 101 may refer to:
 Bristol Type 101, British fighter aircraft in the 1920s
 Bugatti Type 101, motor car made by Bugatti in 1951/52
 Peugeot Type 101, motor car made by Peugeot in 1909, see List of Peugeot vehicles